Kristofer Harris is an English record producer, mixer and writer. He is most noted for his work with Belle and Sebastian, Ghostpoet, Smoke Fairies, Clock Opera and Bear's Den.

Biography 
Kristofer Harris grew up in Kent, United Kingdom, and began his musical career playing in his own bands Tourist and Story Books and also contributed as session musician on tours with Laura Marling, Smoke Fairies and Sea of Bees.

In 2017 Harris mixed a series of singles for Scottish band Belle and Sebastian released in early 2018 on Matador Records. He co-mixed the Ghostpoet album "Dark Days + Canapés" released in 2017 on PIAS Recordings, contributed production to the Bears Den album "Islands" on Communion Records having worked closely with the band on the early "Agape" EP. He co-produced and mixed "Venn" the second album for Clock Opera on !K7 Records, co-produced and mixed the "Other Rivers" album for Matthew and The Atlas also on Communion Records and produced and mixed two albums for the UK band Smoke Fairies; their self-titled "Smoke Fairies" album and also "Wild Winter" which were released on Full Time Hobby Records.

In 2017 Harris mixed and additionally-produced the debut album of Belgian band VRWRK "On The Outside" for Universal Music and produced and mixed tracks for White Room's "Eight" release via Deltasonic Records.

Credits 
Artists Kristofer has worked with include:
 Bears Den
 Belle and Sebastian
 Clock Opera
 Diagrams
 Emmy The Great 
 Ghostpoet
 Indoor Pets
 King No-One
 Matthew and the Atlas
 Monika Linkytė
 Nimmo
 NZCA Lines
 Rachel K Collier 
 Smoke Fairies 
 Story Books
 VRWRK

References

External links 
 Official site

Living people
English record producers
Year of birth missing (living people)